Monadnock Mountain, also called Mount Monadnock, is an inselberg located in the town of Lemington in the Northeast Kingdom region of the U.S. state of Vermont. The mountain overlooks the Connecticut River and the town of Colebrook, New Hampshire to the east. At the summit, an old fire tower offers excellent views of both Vermont and New Hampshire. On a clear day, the view extends as far east as Maine and as far north as Quebec.

The Monadnock Mountain Trail ascends the eastern slope of the mountain.

Norton Mine 
The Norton Mine, (located in Lemington, VT, not Norton, VT) is an abandoned gold mine located near the base of the mountain. It is accessible from the trail along Route 102, turning southwest at 1400' elevation.

The entrance is currently blocked by boulders.

See also 
 List of mountains in Vermont

References

External links 
 
 
 

Mountains of Vermont
Inselbergs of North America
Landforms of Essex County, Vermont
Vermont placenames of Native American origin